Pekka Ansio Heino (born 6 January 1976) is a Finnish singer. He is currently the lead vocalist in AOR band Brother Firetribe. Prior to this, he played in melodic metal band Leverage and  a Finnish rock band called Cashmir, last one with fellow Brother Firetribe member Tomppa Nikulainen.

Discography

Leverage
 Tides (2006)
 Follow Down That River (EP) (2007)
 Blind Fire (2008)
 Circus Colossus (2009)

Brother Firetribe 
False Metal (2006) [Later re-released as Break Out]
"One Single Breath" (single)
"I'm on Fire" (single)
"I am Rock" (single)
"Runaways" (single)
Heart Full of Fire (2008)
Heart Full of Fire... And Then Some (EP)
Live at Apollo (2010)
For Better Or For Worse (2014) (single)
Diamond In The Firepit (2014)
Sunbound (2017)

Cashmir
 Cashmir (1997)

References

External links 
Pekka Heino in Melodicrock.com interview  

Living people
1976 births
21st-century Finnish male singers